A Car-Tune Portrait is a cartoon in the Color Classics series produced by Fleischer Studios. Released on June 26, 1937, the cartoon gives an imaginative take on Franz Liszt's Hungarian Rhapsody No. 2.

Plot
After the brief opening credits set to an orchestrated version of the Minuet in G by Ludwig van Beethoven, the cartoon introduces a lion who is dressed as a musical conductor and attempts to keep his orchestra of animal musicians in order as they half-play and half-fight their way through the piece. Memorable moments include a dachshund playing the xylophone with his back legs while the rest of him sleeps, a group of monkeys using a flute as a pea-shooter to fire at their fellow musicians, and a horse trombonist who attempts to swat a fly with his trombone, but only succeeding in hitting the dog trumpeter in front of him.

In keeping with the building frenzy of Liszt's rhapsody, the animals become more and more violent, playing pranks on each other and generally wreaking havoc, but the piece still goes on. The final scenes see the lion conductor getting smashed over the head with a giant bass drum, at which point he gives in, the music finishes, and the cartoon ends.

Similar cartoons
Other cartoons with similar plots include the Oscar-nominated shorts, Rhapsody in Rivets and The Magic Fluke; an Oscar-winning short, The Cat Concerto; a Merrie Melodie short, Rhapsody Rabbit with Bugs Bunny; a Woody Woodpecker short, Convict Concerto, with a story by Hugh Harman; and a Looney Tunes short, Daffy's Rhapsody.

See also
Song Car-Tunes, 1924–1927 series of cartoons produced by Fleischer Studios and released by Red Seal Pictures.

References

External links
 

1930s animated short films
1937 short films
Color Classics cartoons
Fleischer Studios short films
1930s American animated films
1937 animated films
Paramount Pictures short films
Short films directed by Dave Fleischer
1930s English-language films
American animated short films
Animated films about lions
Films about classical music and musicians